Oskar Gustav Rudolf Berthold (24 March 1891 – 15 March 1920) was a German flying ace of World War I. Between 1916 and 1918, he shot down 44 enemy planes—16 of them while flying one-handed. Berthold's perseverance, bravery, and willingness to return to combat while still wounded made him one of the most famous German pilots of World War I.

Berthold joined the German Imperial Army in 1909, and paid for his own piloting lessons, qualifying in September 1913. He was one of the pioneer aviators of World War I, flying crucial reconnaissance missions during his nation's 1914 invasion of France. His reported observations affected the German troop dispositions at the First Battle of the Aisne. During 1915, he became one of the first flying aces. He rose to command one of the first dedicated fighter units in August 1916; he scored five victories before suffering severe injuries in a crash and being dosed with narcotics while hospitalized for four months. Decamping from hospital, he returned to duty while still unwell to successively command two of Germany's original fighter squadrons. By 24 April 1917, when he was wounded again, he had brought his tally to 12 and won Germany's greatest honor, the Pour le Merite. On 18 August, he once again bolted from medical care to return to battle.

Over the next few weeks, he scored 16 more victories before being crippled by a British bullet on 10 October 1917. With an arm at hazard of amputation, Berthold was rescued by his sister Franziska, who had the medical connections to place him under the care of a specialist. Bedridden until February 1918, Berthold returned to duty to command one of the world's first fighter wings. On 28 May, he began once again to fly combat, though flying one-handed and under the influence of narcotics; he shot down 14 more enemy airplanes by 8 August 1918. On 10 August, he shot down his final two victims on his final flight before being downed himself. After two days in the hospital, he once again fled treatment and return to combat. Only a direct order from Kaiser Wilhelm II returned him to medical care for the rest of the war.

In postwar Germany, Rudolf Berthold organized a Freikorps and fought the Bolsheviks in Latvia. He died of gunshot wounds during political street fighting in Harburg on 15 March 1920.

Early life and entry into military
Oskar Gustav Rudolf Berthold was born on 24 March 1891, in Ditterswind, Kingdom of Bavaria in the German Empire. He was the sixth child of Oberförster (Head Forester) Oskar Berthold. The young child, familiarly known as Rudolf, was the first born to Helene Stief Berthold, Oskar's second wife. Oskar's first wife, Ida Anne Hoffmann Berthold, died in childbirth, leaving as survivors a daughter and three sons. Rudolf was followed by three younger brothers, two of whom survived to adulthood.

Rudolf's father was employed by a local nobleman, Oskar Freiherr von Deuster; Rudolf grew up roving the baron's great estate. Early in September 1897, Rudolf began his education. By the time he had completed his studies at the Humanistische Neue Gymnasium (New Secondary School for the Humanities) in nearby Bamberg at age 14, he had adopted a personal motto from Horace: "It is sweet and fitting to die for one's Fatherland." Rudolf moved to Schweinfurt's Königliches Humanistische Gymnasium (Royal Secondary School for Humanities) for sixth level classes. In late 1909, he transferred to the Altes Gymnasium (Old Secondary School) in Bamberg to better fit himself for military service. He graduated on 14 July 1910, with a reputation for being fearless, cheerful, and studious.

Berthold's military career began when he joined the 3rd Brandenberg Infantry Regiment in Wittenberg. He served a year and a half's training as a Fähnrich (Officer Candidate) before being accepted by its officers for commissioning as a leutnant.

Der Fliegertruppe (The Flying Troop) became an official part of the German Imperial Army on 1 October 1912. Berthold learned to fly at his own expense in 1913, qualifying as a pilot in September. He trained at the Halberstädter Flugzeugwerke (Halberstadt Aircraft Factory) on dual-control Bristol types; one of his fellow students was Oswald Boelcke. After informing his family he had a "special assignment" to a flying school, Berthold underwent military flight training during July 1914.

World War I

1914
The outbreak of World War I disrupted the young aviator's progress. On 1 July, Berthold was recalled from his schooling to rejoin his infantry regiment. After a fortnight's refresher course in soldierly skills, he was returned to flying training. On 17 July 1914, he was officially transferred out of the 3rd Brandenbergers to aerial service. His infantry refresher course had aborted his pilot training, and he had to settle for duty as an aerial observer. On 1 August, he entrained for the Royal Saxon Air Base at Grossenhain.

By 7 August, Berthold was assigned to Feldflieger-Abteilung 23 (Field Flier Detachment 23, FFA 23), supporting the German 2nd Army. By 9 August, FFA 23 was encamped at Monschau near the Belgian border. On 15 August, Berthold was chosen for the unit's first reconnaissance mission. Two days later, his pilot strayed off-course; Bertholdt and his pilot landed, lost. They evaded French cavalry, to direct retrieval of their DFW biplane. In his diary, Berthold noted his decision to complete pilot's training.

Berthold was also the observer on flights on 1 and 3 September. He saw panicked French troops retreating across the Marne River. Later in the month, he discovered the French counter-thrust between the German 1st and 2nd Armies. German staff officers' disbelief led to Berthold personally briefing Generaloberst Karl von Bülow on the situation. Bülow moved his troops to higher ground; the First Battle of the Aisne began. General Bülow had received the initial Second Class Iron Cross for the 2nd Army; he personally awarded the second one to Berthold on 13 September.

On 4 October, Berthold was awarded the Iron Cross, First Class by General Bülow. Again, Berthold received his award second only to Bülow. As November's winter weather limited combat flying, Berthold arranged to continue his pilot's training at a nearby flight park. He became friends with a fellow student, Hans Joachim Buddecke.

1915

Rudolf Berthold finally qualified as a military pilot on 18 January 1915. He arranged Buddecke's transfer into FFA 223. Berthold was assigned an observer, Leutnant Josef Grüner, for flying reconnaissance sorties; they quickly became friends. In June, they were finally supplied with machine guns for their aircraft; Berthold could cease futile assaults on the enemy with his pistol. At about the same time, Berthold was laid up for a fortnight with dysentery. FFA 223 was re-equipped with AEG G.II bombers in August. The twin-engine giant was armed with two swiveling machine guns and manned by a pilot and two gunners. The unit also received its first single-seat fighter with a synchronized gun, a Fokker Eindekker.

Berthold knew he could cross the lines searching for opponents in the AEG G.II, while the Eindekker was restricted to patrolling behind German lines. Berthold took command of the big bomber, and left the Eindekker to Buddecke. This decision sped Buddecke on his way to being a member of the first wave of German aces that included Oswald Boelcke, Max Immelmann, and Kurt Wintgens. Meanwhile, Berthold damaged his original G.II in a landing accident on 15 September, and had to return to piloting an old two-seater.

Shortly thereafter, he returned to Germany to pick up a replacement G.II. By 1 October, he was using it as a gunship for air defense missions, as well as for bombing. On 6 November, one of those missions turned deadly; a British Vickers F.B.5 gunner mortally wounded Grüner. Berthold was depressed by his friend's death, and sent on home leave. In early December, Buddecke was seconded to the Turkish Air Force and Berthold fell heir to his Eindekker. He accompanied Ernst Freiherr von Althaus when the latter shot down enemy planes on both 5 and 28 December 1915.

1916

As the Germans pioneered use of aircraft with synchronized guns, they began to group the new aerial weapons into ad hoc units to protect reconnaissance and bombing aircraft. These new units were dubbed Kampfseinsitzer Kommando (Single-seater fighter detachment). On 11 January, Kampfseinsitzer Kommando Vaux formed near FFA 223; Berthold was placed in charge. Even as the pioneering fighter units formed, on 14 January, the British Royal Flying Corps (RFC) Headquarters directed that any reconnaissance craft crossing into German-held territory be escorted by at least three protective aircraft.

On 2 February, Berthold and Althaus shot down a French Voisin LA apiece. It was Berthold's first aerial victory. He scored another three days later. Then, on 10 February, Berthold was himself downed, with a punctured fuel tank and a slightly wounded left hand. He was rewarded with one of the 12 Military Merit Orders awarded to aviators during the war.

Berthold continued flying a bomber on missions as well as to patrol in his fighter. After he scored another victory, he was again honored by his native Kingdom of Bavaria, this time with the Knight's Cross of the Military Order of Saint Henry on 15 April.

On 25 April, Berthold made an emergency landing after enemy bullets crippled his Fokker's engine. He took off again in a Pfalz E.IV. He reawakened two days later in Kriegslazarett 7 (Military Hospital 7) in Saint-Quentin. Besides a badly broken left leg, Berthold had suffered a broken nose and upper jaw, with attendant damage to his optic nerves. He was prescribed narcotic painkillers for chronic pain. At that time, German military doctors used three narcotics as remedies—opium, morphine, and codeine. Doctors prescribed cocaine to counteract the somnolence of these three depressant drugs. Berthold's exact prescription is unknown.

Eventually, although Berthold's eyesight returned, he was unable to fly for four months, but nevertheless remained in command of KEK Vaux. Between the message traffic brought to him, and the accounts of his visiting subordinates, he learned of ongoing casualties. His brother Wolfram had been killed in action as an infantryman on 29 April. Max Immelmann perished in battle on 18 June. After Immelmann's death, Germany's highest scoring ace, Oswald Boelcke, was grounded for fear that his loss would be disastrous to morale. In the meantime, Berthold was scheduled to be evacuated back to Germany. Instead, in late July, he commandeered a car and returned to his unit. Unable to fly, he could still command. He made his orderly help him bend his knee and flex strength back into his withered leg.

On 24 August, Berthold scored his sixth victory, although he had to be helped into his fighter. The next day, KEK Vaux became Jagdstaffel 4 (Fighter Squadron 4) under Berthold's command; the new unit started with a starred roster—Wilhelm Frankl, Walter Höhndorf, and Ernst Freiherr von Althaus were early members—all fated to become prominent aces. On 27 August, Berthold received the Royal House Order of Hohenzollern. Berthold was very near attaining the Prussian Pour le Merite for eight victories. After disallowed claims on two occasions, on 26 September, Berthold was finally credited with his eighth victory. He received his Blue Max, considered Imperial Germany's supreme award for valor, on 12 October 1916. His was only the tenth award for aviators. Five of the other living recipients attended the 16 October celebration of the award, including Buddecke, Althaus, Frankl, Höhndorf, and Kurt Wintgens. The following day, Berthold's was assigned as Staffelführer (Squadron Commander) of Jagdstaffel 14 (Fighter Squadron 14).

Jagdstaffel 14 was newly formed when Berthold took command at Sarrebourg, France. Its motley assortment of fighters included two Fokker E.IIIs, a Halberstadt D.II, and seven Fokker D.IIs. It had had no success when it was still the ad hoc Fokker Kampstaffel Falkenhausen. Berthold took advantage of being in a quiet sector, and trained his troops hard. He brought in new Albatros D.I and Albatros D.II replacement fighter aircraft, and renovated the officers' mess. In mid-December, following the unit's first victory, they were inspected by Kaiser Wilhelm II and Crown Prince Wilhelm.

1917
In January Berthold and his squadron were subordinated to Armee-Abteilung A (Army Division A). Anticipating the future need for air protection, Berthold made an unheeded plea for amassing air power into larger units, and supported his proposal with detailed professional analysis. In February, Jagdstaffel 14 scored only two victories. However, it was slated to move to more active duty in Laon, and began to rearm with Albatros D.III fighters. Berthold flew to Laon to find there were no quarters for his men. He was adamant that he would not move his squadron until quarters were furnished. In mid-March, a convoy of trucks hauled the squadron  to Marchais, France. They began operations on 17 March.

Berthold had an Albatros D.III prepared as his assigned aircraft. Its guns were test-fired to check its synchronization gear. It was painted with his personal insignia of a white-winged sword of vengeance on either side of the fuselage. By September, his entire squadron had adopted his basic scheme of royal blue fuselages and scarlet cowlings, plus additional personal insignia. On 24 March, Berthold resumed his successful air assaults and was credited with four more victories by mid-April. On 24 April he engaged a French Caudron R.9 until driven back to base by a bullet through his right shin. This wound added more chronic pain to his misery, and caused him to convalesce at home from 23 May to 15 June. By now, his narcotics addiction was an open secret to his pilots.

From reports, Berthold determined that his squadron's performance declined, and believed this was due to the lack of in-air leadership. In early August, he returned to his old training facility in Grossenhain and wrangled a medical clearance from its doctor. Berthold returned to his unit to await the paperwork, to discover that he was being transferred to command Jagdstaffel 18 (Fighter Squadron 18) in Harelbeke, Belgium, on 12 August. On 18 August, Berthold was finally certified to resume flying. Before Berthold's arrival, Jagdstaffel 18 had had little success; their new commander promptly emphasized training even as they flew combat missions. Shortly after assuming command, Berthold again pitched his idea of using fighters en masse; 4th Armee headquarters responded by grouping Jagdstaffelen 18, 24, 31, and 36 into the ad hoc Jagdgruppe 7 with Berthold in command. He shot down a SPAD on 21 August, raising his tally to 13. It was the beginning of a string of 16 aerial victories. During September he scored 14 more victories, bringing his tally to 27. On 2 October he scored his 28th victory, his final one of the year.

During a dogfight on 10 October, a British bullet ricocheted within the cockpit of Berthold's aircraft and entered his arm at an angle that pulverized his right humerus. Berthold overcame the handicap of half-severed ailerons and remained conscious long enough to make a smooth one-handed landing at the Jagdstaffel 18 home airfield. He passed out after his safe arrival. His unconscious body was lifted from his Fokker and rushed  to the field hospital in Courtrai.

The Coutrai hospital lacked the facilities to heal such a complex injury; however, it sufficed to keep him alive. It was three weeks before the wounded ace was stable enough to be transferred. On 31 October, he was shipped back to Germany. His pilots alerted his elder sister, Franziska, who was a nursing supervisor in Viktoria-Lazarett (Victoria Hospital), Berlin. She arranged for her brother's diversion to the Berlin clinic of one of Germany's pre-eminent surgeons, Doctor August Bier, pioneer of cocaine usage in spinal anesthesia. Berthold entered the clinic on 2 November 1917. He was there for four months and Doctor Bier labored to save the mangled arm from amputation. Meantime, counter to Berthold's wishes, Oberleutnant Ernst Wilhelm Turck assumed Berthold's dual commands of Jagdstaffel 18 and Jagdgruppe 7. Berthold spent his convalescent leave learning to write with his left hand. He believed, "If I can write, I can fly." Meantime, his right arm remained paralyzed as it slowly healed and he remained dependent on narcotics.

1918

Return to duty

By February, Berthold could get out of bed. In mid-month, he volunteered to return to command of Jagdgruppe 7. On 1 March, he reported to the medical office of Flieger-Ersatz-Abteilung 5 (Replacement Detachment 5) in Hannover. He was returned to command of Jagstaffel 18, but denied permission to fly. On 6 March, with his arm in a sling, he rejoined his old squadron at its new duty station. Within two days, on 8 March, Berthold had arranged for Hans-Joachim Buddecke's transfer into the unit to lead it in the air. Two days later, Buddecke was killed in action.

On 16 March, Rudolf Berthold was transferred to command Jagdgeschwader II (Fighter Wing 2) to replace Hauptmann Adolf Ritter von Tutschek, killed in action the previous day. The new wing had been copied from the pioneering Jagdgeschwader II; it was crucial to the German spring offensive that was to be launched on 21 March. Berthold was in a tenuous and stressful situation. He had suffered the loss of his best friend, left his familiar old squadron, was taking command of an unfamiliar and newly formed larger unit, and was not on flight status. His solution to his dilemma was to take advantage of a loophole. Customarily, a Luftstreitkräfte commander being transferred swapped a small cadre of his unit into his new assignment.  Berthold designated Jagdstaffel 15 (Fighter Squadron 15) the wing's Stab Staffel (command squadron). Then he effected a wholesale exchange of Jagdstaffel 18 people and aircraft into Jagdstaffel 15. In turn, Jagdstaffel 15 personnel and airplanes moved to Jagdstaffel 18, completing the trade. Berthold then departed for Buddecke's funeral in Berlin on 22 March. He returned to his new assignment two days into the new German offensive, to find that the infantry divisions his wing was supposed to support were complaining about their lack of air cover. Jagdgeschwader II'''s performance improved under its grounded commander's guidance, as the Germans advanced  in eight days.

On 6 April, nine Siemens-Schuckert D.III fighters began to arrive. Despite high expectations for the craft because of its superior performance, it suffered engine failures after only seven to ten hours usage. The type was rapidly withdrawn from the wing. Meanwhile, Berthold had his men begin repainting the wing's aircraft with a common background marking. The wing's craft had standard dark blue paint applied to the fuselage, a la Jagdstaffel 15. However, instead of also copying a scarlet nose from them, the other squadrons each sported their own hue on the cowlings. Jagdstaffel 12 had white cowlings; Jagdstaffel 13 had dark green ones; Jagdstaffel 19 settled on yellow. To these markings, pilots added their own personal insignia.

On the night of 12 April, French artillery directed by a reconnaissance aircraft began shelling the Jagdgeschwader 2 airfield. By the following morning the airfield and its equipment had been hit over 200 times by shellbursts. Though no one was killed, damage was such that the wing was essentially out of action for the next three weeks, as it changed airfields and re-equipped.

In the meantime, Berthold fretted, 

He kept his sister apprised of his medical condition. On 25 April, he wrote,

Franziska Berthold wrote of her brother, 

During this inactive stretch, Berthold outlined his intended use of the wing in a memorandum to headquarters. He outlined an air defense warning net posted forward to alert his wing, and he pleaded for a transport column to maintain the unit's mobility. Aside from this memo, he planned personnel changes in his new wing. He felt that the squadron commanders were plotting to have him replaced. By 18 May, the last of them had been replaced. The wing's score improved for that month, totaling 19 victories.

Return to aerial combat

Berthold had often flown a Pfalz D.III in preference to the Albatros D.V. In May 1918, the new Fokker D.VII entered service. Berthold borrowed one of the new machines from Jagdgeschwader 1 (Fighter Wing 1) for a surreptitious test flight. He liked its lightness on the controls, remarking hopefully that he could even fly it with his damaged right arm. On the morning of 28 May, he mounted a brand-new Fokker D.VII and for the first time, led his air wing into combat. Although it was a ground-support mission, he took the opportunity to score his 29th victory. The following day, he downed two more enemy aircraft, despite a malfunctioning gun synchronizer that nearly shot away his own propeller and caused a crash-landing. Berthold's drug addiction did not handicap him in the air. Georg von Hantelmann, one of his pilots, noted that despite his undiminished martial skills, his morphine addiction made him temperamentally erratic. Nevertheless, his subordinates remained loyal to him.

Berthold's victory tally increased by half a dozen victories during June. Meantime, on 18 June, Berthold again advised his sister of his ongoing medical problems. 

He took a break until 28 June, when he scored his 37th victory. That night, he wrote his sister, 

His festering wound was not his only stressor. As summer's heat came on, the engines of the Fokker Triplanes of Jagdstaffel 12 began overheating, aggravated by the lack of genuine castor oil for lubrication. Occasionally, the lack of replacement Triplanes grounded the squadron, and hampered its sister squadron, Jagdstaffel 13. New Fokker D.VIIs arrived in the wing, but only sufficed to re-equip Jagdstaffel 15. By mid-June, the triplanes of Jagdstaffel 12 were deemed unserviceable. Jagdstaffel 19 had only partially rearmed with new Fokker D.VIIs. The understrength wing also suffered fuel shortages. To remain operational, fuel and lubricants were channeled to the most useful craft, the D.VIIs. On 19 June, Jagdstaffel 12 and Jagdstaffel 19 had no usable aircraft, and the wing was reduced to half strength or below. The bereft squadrons would slowly restock with D.VIIs after the triplanes were removed from the wing. Relief finally came on 28 June, when a shipment of 14 Fokker D.VIIs arrived and were divided between Jagdstaffel 12 and Jagdstaffel 19.

Berthold fought on, scoring two more victories in July. However, now that he had re-equipped his fighter wing, influenza grounded all but three pilots from Jagdstaffel 19 by 6 July. Berthold scored three more victories in early August, raising his tally to 42. On 10 August, he led 12 of his pilots into battle against a vastly superior force of British aircraft. He shot down a Royal Aircraft Factory SE.5a fighter for his 43rd victory and an Airco DH.9 bomber for his 44th. When he tried to pull away from the DH.9 at  altitude, his controls came loose in his hand. His attempt to use a parachute failed because it required the use of both hands. His Fokker crashed into a house in Ablaincourt with such force that its engine fell into the cellar. German infantrymen plucked him from the rubble and rushed him to hospital. His right arm was rebroken at its previous fracture. Rudolf Berthold would never fly again.

On 12 August, Berthold once again checked himself out of a hospital. He arrived at the Jagdstaffel 15 officers' mess coincidentally with the newly appointed wing commander. Berthold stared down Rittmeister Heinz Freiherr von Brederlow, who was senior to him, and announced, "Here I am the boss." Once Brederlow departed, Berthold took to bed, stating he would run the fighter wing from there. On the 14th, Kaiser Wilhelm II personally ordered the ace to take sick leave, and appointed Berthold's deputy commander, Leutnant Josef Veltjens, to take command of the wing. On 16 August, Berthold returned to Doctor Bier's clinic, being treated there through early October. Once his pains were alleviated, he went home to recuperate. The war ended while he was convalescing.

Post-war
In early 1919, Berthold was medically cleared to return to duty. On 24 February, he assumed the command of Döberitz Airfield in Berlin. He soon had the airfield functioning smoothly when it was shut down. Berthold then put out a call for volunteers to form a Freikorps militia to stave off communist insurrectionists. His renown attracted 1,200 men, mostly from his native Franconia. He founded the Fränkische Bauern-Detachment Eiserne Schar Berthold (Franconian Farmer's Detachment: Iron Troop Berthold) in April 1919. They were trained by late May. His troopers were bound to him solely by personal loyalty. In August, Berthold's Freikorps  moved to the Baltic states to fight Bolsheviks. In September, the Freikorps became part of the Iron Division in Lithuania. They engaged leftist forces in Latvia at Klaipėda and Riga, and fought on into a bitter winter. The last three weeks of 1919 were spent encamped on the German-Lithuanian border before their return to Germany.

On 1 January 1920, Berthold and his troops entrained at Memel for Stade, to the west of Hamburg. They arrived with 800 men with 300 rifles and a handful of machine-guns. They were scheduled to disarm on 15 March 1920. However, on 13 March, the military attempted the Kapp Putsch. Wolfgang Kapp and General Walther von Lüttwitz called on all Freikorps and Reichswehr (Army) units to maintain public order. Chancellor Friedrich Ebert countered by calling a general strike. The Freikorps voted to join the putsch, so Berthold's men commandeered a train and crew from striking rail workers and moved to join the coup. Slowed by doused signals along the rail line, they got as far as Harburg, Hamburg on the evening of 14 March; there they bivouacked in Heimfelder Middle School.

The Independent Socialist government of Harburg anticipated the imminent arrival of the Freikorps by arresting the commander of local Pionier-Bataillon 9 (Pioneer Battalion 9), leaving its 900 trained soldiers leaderless. On the morning of 15 March 1920, trade-union leaders tried to talk the pioneers into disarming the Freikorps, to no avail. Union workers were then armed to face the Freikorps, and converged on the middle school. Meanwhile, Burgomaster (Mayor) Heinrich Denicke offered safe passage out of town to the Freikorps if they would disarm. Berthold refused. After noon, when the workers had gathered, a machine gun fired over their heads to clear an exit passage out of the school. Instead of fleeing in panic, the union men shot back. In the ensuing firefight, 13 workers and three Freikorps combatants were killed. An additional eight Freikorps fighters were summarily executed after being captured. The school grounds were encircled. The Freikorps was besieged.

By late afternoon, Freikorps ammunition was running low. Calling a truce, Berthold negotiated a safe passage for those of his men who would disarm. At about 18:00 hours, the Freikorps filed out of the schoolhouse to disarm. A crowd of onlookers who had not been part of the negotiations were outraged by the civilian casualties, and they mobbed the Freikorps. There is a widespread myth that Rudolf Berthold was strangled with the ribbon of his Pour le Merite. The truth is more prosaic and more brutal. Berthold doubled back through the school when the mob attacked. As he exited the back door, someone spotted his Pour le Merite and yelled the alarm. A mob overpowered Berthold. His handgun was taken from him and used to shoot him twice in the head and four times in the body as the mob mauled him. Hans Wittmann, who retrieved Berthold's body, described it thus:

Berthold's remains were taken to the Wandsbeke hospital, in a Hamburg suburb. Two of his old fliers who lived in Hamburg rushed to the hospital. They stayed with Berthold's body until Franziska arrived from Berlin. Berthold's Pour le Merite, Iron Cross First Class, and Pilot's Badge were retrieved from a garbage dump in Harburg before she arrived.

Funeral and aftermath

Rudolf Berthold was buried on 30 March 1920. Although pallbearers were customarily of the same rank as the deceased, his family requested that sergeants from his Freikorps do the honors. On Berthold's first gravestone, since destroyed, was allegedly the memorial: "Honored by his enemies, killed by his German brethren". However, a literal translation of the inscription is "slain in the brother fight for the freedom of the German lands". After receiving complaints about lynch law justice, the Stade police investigated Berthold's murder. In February 1921, two men were tried and acquitted of the killing.

Legacy

When the Nazis rose to power, they exploited Berthold's name for propaganda purposes. They ignored his monarchist beliefs, and trumpeted his nationalist fervor. City streets were named for him in Bamberg and Wittenberg, among others. However, when the Nazis lost World War II, the streets lost the Berthold name. The Invalidenfriedhof'' lay near the dividing line between East Berlin and West Berlin. Tombstones were removed from many graves in 1960, including Berthold's, so that communist border guards preventing escapes from East Berlin had a better view of the boundary. Berthold's stone disappeared. However, after Germany's reunification, private donors raised the funds for a simple marker to be placed on his grave in 2003.

Honors and awards

 Prussian Iron Cross
 13 September 1914: Second Class award
 4 October 1914: First Class award
 18 January 1915: Prussian military pilot badge 
 29 February 1916: Bavarian Military Merit Order, 4th class
 8 April 1916: Saxony's Knight's Cross of the Military Order of Saint Henry
 27 August 1916: Prussia's Knight's Cross with Swords of the House Order of Hohenzollern 
 12 October 1916: Prussian Pour le Merite

Translation notes

Endnotes

References

Further reading

External links
The Aerodrome – Rudolf Berthold
 

1891 births
1920 deaths
People from Haßberge (district)
People from the Kingdom of Bavaria
German World War I flying aces
Luftstreitkräfte personnel
Recipients of the Pour le Mérite (military class)
Burials at the Invalids' Cemetery
20th-century Freikorps personnel
Kapp Putsch participants
German anti-communists
Deaths by firearm in Germany
Military personnel from Bavaria
Lynching deaths